The A116 road is a road in England connecting Manor Park, London and Wanstead.

References

Roads in England